Tiwalola Olanubi Jnr (born June 28, 1988) is a Nigerian media, food and technology entrepreneur.

He is the founder of the digital marketing firm Dotts Media House; and a bread company called Zarafet Loaves. He is also the publisher of the Nigerian Influencer Marketing Report (NIMR).

Education 
Olanubi Jnr was born in Lagos to Engr Tiwalola Wallace Olanubi and Oluwatoyin Olanubi. He attended St Raphael's Primary School, Ondo, Hallmark Secondary School, Ondo and the Becky Parker College, Akure. He studied Quantity Surveying at the University of Lagos.

Career 
Olanubi Jnr developed interest in marketing and communications while in the University of Lagos by promoting entertainment events on campus. In his 3rd year in the university, he was appointed as a brand ambassador for Blackberry Nigeria. This reinforced his interest in media and communications. After graduation, Olanubi Jnr established DottsMediaHouse (a digital marketing and communications firm) which has now expanded into a group company - Dotts Group with three subsidiaries which include DottsMediaHouse Limited, Dotts Co-Working Space, and Asteri Africa (a booking and management firm).

In 2017, Olanubi Jnr also founded a food company – Zarafet Loaves an outfit into the production of bread. And in 2019, He co-founded an influencers and content creators platform called Trendupp Africa.

In 2018, The Guardian Life Magazine wrote that Olanubi is one of the Nigerian youths shaping the future while Vanguard Allure listed him as one of the 12 outstanding youths nominated for Future Awards. In 2018, His communications Firm, DottsMediaHouse was named Africa’s Most Outstanding Quality Digital Marketing Company of the year by African Quality Achievement Award and also named West Africa Digital Marketing Agency of the decade.

In 2019, Olanubi led his team at Dotts MediaHouse in publishing Nigeria’s first ever influencer marketing report called NIMR (Nigerian Influencer Marketing Report). The report is published annually and shared at the social media week lagos to media enthusiasts & content creators.

Olanubi Jnr in the past five years has been involved in CSR Projects including Leap Africa's Youth Day of Service, NaijaHacks Hackaton etc, Tiwalola is passionate about Governance, youth development and Entrepreneurship.

Awards 
Olanubi Jnr was nominated twice in three years for Future Awards Africa.

2017: Prize in Media Enterprise.

2019: Prize in Business.

He was named the Young CEO of 2019 at the Creative Faith Academy Awards.

He was awarded in 2020 as the CEO of the year at the BrandCOM Awards.

Ynaija recognized him as one of the 10 under 40 most powerful young persons on social media.

References 

Living people
Businesspeople from Lagos State
University of Lagos alumni
1988 births